

Films

LGBT
1964 in LGBT history
1964
1964